Kridsadaporn (กฤษฎาพร or กฤษดาพร) is a Thai name. It comprises two words: kritsada (กฤษฎา), from Sanskrit kṛṣṭā, meaning "supernatural powers, divine, celestial"; and phon (พร), meaning "blessing, benediction, favour".

Often Thai first names are suffixed with phon, denoting "a blessing from the Buddha", referring to both the gift of a child, and the favour of particular attributes, referred to within the name, manifesting within the child. In Thai tradition, a child's name is chosen using complex Buddhist name giving rituals where Thai astrology is widely used, often in consultation with a Buddhist monk.
Parents of a newly-born child named Kridsadaporn (กฤษฎาพร) may believe, or may accept, the name's meaning as, "a blessing from the Buddha; a child, gifted with divine qualities and supernatural powers".

See also 
 Asteroid 7604 Kridsadaporn

Notes

References 

Thai names
Thai language